Victor van den Bogert (born 12 August 1999) is a Dutch professional footballer who plays as a centre-back for Eerste Divisie club FC Den Bosch.

Club career
On 17 March 2017, van den Bogert signed his first professional contract with Willem II. He made his professional debut for Willem II in a 4–2 Eredivisie loss to SC Heerenveen on 3 March 2019.

References

External links
Soccerway Profile
Willem II Profile
 

1999 births
Living people
Footballers from Utrecht (city)
Dutch footballers
Association football defenders
Willem II (football club) players
De Graafschap players
FC Den Bosch players
Eredivisie players
Eerste Divisie players